Fernando de Fuentes Carrau (December 12, 1894 – July 4, 1958) was a Mexican film director, considered a pioneer in the film industry worldwide. He is perhaps best known for directing the films El prisionero trece, El compadre Mendoza, and Vámonos con Pancho Villa, all part of his Revolution Trilogy on the Mexican Revolution.

Biography

Early life and education
Born in Veracruz; Mexico on December 13, 1894, son of Fernando de Fuentes and Emelina Carrau de Fuentes. He studied Philosophy at Tulane University in New Orleans.

Career
On his return to Mexico he worked as executive assistant of Venustiano Carranza during the Mexican Revolution. After his marriage in 1919, he moved to Washington D.C., and worked at the Mexican Embassy. Back in Mexico, he wrote poetry and undertook journalism as a hobby, and worked in the Film Industry  in exhibition. In 1932 he made his first film, “El Anónimo”, and in the same year “Una Vida por Otra”, in 1933 “El prisionero trece”, “La calandria”, “El Tigre de Yautepec” and “El compadre Mendoza”, considered one of his masterpieces, in the Mexican Revolution Trilogy, (“El Compadre Mendoza”, “Vámonos con Pancho Villa” and “El prisionero trece”).

In 1934 he directed “El Fantasma del Convento”, and “Cruz Diablo”. In 1935 he made “Vámonos Pancho Villa”, and “La Familia Dressel”, in 1936 “Las Mujeres Mandan” and one of the greatest hits in the history of the Mexican cinema, “Alla en el Rancho Grande” - a film that developed a complete new genre the “comedia ranchera”, with this film he was awarded the “Medalla al Mérito Cinematográfico” by the Mexican President General Lázaro Cárdenas. This film also won first place at the “Venice Film Festival” in 1938. It was the first International award won by a Mexican film.

Described as "the Mexican John Ford" (New York Times), Fernando de Fuentes was by far the most talented filmmaker of early Mexican sound cinema. This tragic trilogy set during the Mexican Revolution was possibly his greatest achievement. Prisoner 13 (1933, 76 mins.) concerns a son who pays for his father's faults and a desperate mother who tries at all costs to save her son's life. El Compadre Mendoza (1933, 85 mins.) examines the corrupted ideals of the Revolution by way of an opportunistic landowner, who must choose between remaining loyal to a general in Zapata's army (and facing financial ruin) or saving his own skin. Lastly, Fuentes' sweeping epic Let's Go with Pancho Villa (1936, 92 mins.) follows the adventures of six young men who leave their rural homes to join Pancho Villa's army, enduring hardship, loss, and disillusionment over the Revolution in the process. Shot by Gabriel Figueroa (The Fugitive), one of the world's most gifted black and white cinematographers.

His filmography covers almost all the different genres from drama, comedy, horror, family, historical, to classics and documentaries.

Marriage and children
De Fuentes married in 1919, Magdalena Reyes Moran in San Antonio Texas. They had two children, Magdalena and Fernando.

Death
Fernando de Fuentes died on July 4, 1958 in Mexico City aged 63.

Filmography

Director 
El anónimo (1933)
El prisionero trece (1933)
La calandria (1933)
The Tiger of Yautepec  (1933)
El compadre Mendoza (1934)
El fantasma del convento (1934)
Cruz Diablo (1934)
La familia Dressel (1935)
Petróleo (1936)
Desfile deportivo (1936)
Allá en el Rancho Grande (1936)
Vámonos con Pancho Villa (1936)
Las mujeres mandan (1937)
Bajo el cielo de México (1937)
La Zandunga (1938)
La casa del ogro (1939)
Papacito lindo (1939)
Allá en el trópico (1940)
El jefe máximo (1940)
Creo en Dios (1941)
La gallina clueca (1941)
¡Así se quiere en Jalisco! (1942)
Doña Bárbara (1943)
La mujer sin alma (1944)
El Rey se divierte (1944)
Hasta que perdió Jalisco (1945)
La selva de fuego (1945)
Esperanza (1946)
La devoradora (1946)
Allá en el Rancho Grande (1949)
Jalisco Sings in Seville (1949)
Hipólito, el de Santa (1950)
Por la puerta falsa (1950)
Crimen y castigo (1951)
Los hijos de María Morales (1952)
Canción de cuna (1953)
Tres citas con el destino (1954)

Producer 
La familia Dressel (1935)
Petróleo (1936)
Allá en el Rancho Grande (1936)
La casa del ogro (1939)
Papacito lindo (1939)
Allá en el trópico (1940)
El jefe máximo (1940)
Creo en Dios (1941)
¡Así se quiere en Jalisco! (1942)
Doña Bárbara (1943)
El rey se divierte (1944)
La devoradora (1946)
Si Adelita se fuera con otro (1948)
Allá en el Rancho Grande (1949)
Jalisco canta en Sevilla (1949)
El colmillo de Buda (1949)
Las tandas del principal (1949)
No me defiendas compadre (1949)
Hipólito, el de Santa (1950)
Médico de guardia (1950)
Por la puerta falsa (1950)
Corazón de fiera (1951)(productor ejecutivo)
Entre abogados te veas (1951) (productor ejecutivo)
Crimen y castigo (1951)
Paco the Elegant  (1952)
Las locuras de Tin-Tan (1952)
Los hijos de María Morales (1952)
Canción de cuna (1953)
La intrusa (1954)
Escuela de vagabundos (1955)
Las aventuras de Pito Pérez (1957)
Que me toquen las golondrinas (1957)
La sombra del otro (1957)
Escuela para suegras (1958)
A Thousand and One Nights (1958)
¡Paso a la juventud..! (1958)
Amor se dice cantando (1959)
Farewell to Marriage (1968)

Writer 
Una vida por otra (1932)
El anónimo (1933)
La llorona (1933)
El prisionero trece (1933)
La calandria (1933) (guionista y dialogo)
El tigre de Yautepec (1933)
El compadre Mendoza (1934) (guionista)
El fantasma del convento (1934)
Cruz Diablo (1934)
La familia Dressel (1935)
Petróleo (1936)
Allá en el Rancho Grande (1936) (guionista)
Vámonos con Pancho Villa (1936) (adaptation)
Las mujeres mandan (1937)Bajo el cielo de México (1937)La zandunga (1938) (guionista y dialogo)La casa del ogro (1939)Allá en el trópico (1940)El jefe máximo (1940)Creo en Dios (1941)La gallina clueca (1941)¡Así se quiere en Jalisco! (1942)Doña Bárbara (1943)La mujer sin alma (1944)El rey se divierte (1944)Hasta que perdió Jalisco (1945)La selva de fuego (1945) (guionista)La devoradora (1946)Allá en el Rancho Grande (1949) (adaptation y dialogo)Jalisco canta en Sevilla (1949)Hipólito, el de Santa (1950) (guionista)Por la puerta falsa (1950)Casa de vecindad (1951)La hija del ministro (1952)Escuela de vagabundos (1955) (adaptation)Las aventuras de Pito Pérez (1957) (adaptation)Que me toquen las golondrinas (1957)La sombra del otro (1957) (adaptation)Las mil y una noches (1958) (adaptation)Aladino y la lámpara maravillosa (1958)Angustia de un secreto (1959)La casa del terror (1960) (sin créditos)Face of the Screaming Werewolf (1964) (secuencias del lobo)El dinero tiene miedo (1970)

 Editor Águilas frente al sol (1932)La calandria (1933)El tigre de Yautepec (1933)El compadre Mendoza (1934)El fantasma del convento (1934)Cruz Diablo (1934)La familia Dressel (1935)Allá en el Rancho Grande (1936)

References

Robert Sklar. A World History of Film Abrams, 1993.
Ephraim Katz, Ronald Dean Nolen. The Film Encyclopedia. 6th edition. HarperCollins, 2008. p. 363.Fernando de Fuentes''. Ed. Emilio García Riera. Cineteca Nacional, 1984.

External links

1894 births
1958 deaths
Mexican film directors
Golden Ariel Award winners
People from Veracruz (city)
Tulane University alumni